Frederick Murray "Muzz" Patrick (June 28, 1915 – July 27, 1998) was a Canadian ice hockey player, coach, and general manager. He played in the National Hockey League with the New York Rangers from 1938 to 1941, and then from 1945 to 1946. He was general manager of the Rangers from 1955 to 1964, serving as coach on three separate occasions during that time. As a player Patrick won the Stanley Cup with the Rangers in 1940. He was part of the Patrick family, which had a long association with hockey: his father Lester had previously worked as the Rangers coach and manager, among other roles; his uncle Frank had founded the Pacific Coast Hockey Association with Lester; and Muzz's brother Lynn had played on the Rangers with him and later coached and managed the Boston Bruins.

Early life
Patrick was born in Victoria, British Columbia, in 1915. He excelled at several sports as a kid, including boxing, and in 1934, he won the Canadian amateur heavyweight title.

Ice hockey career
Patrick began his professional hockey career with the EAHL's New York Crescents in 1934, and in 1938, he started playing for the NHL's New York Rangers. He helped the team win the Stanley Cup in 1939–40. From 1941 to 1945, Patrick served in the U.S. military and attained the rank of captain.

After the war, Patrick played for the Rangers for one season and in 1946 left the team to accept a position as a player-coach with the St. Paul Saints of the United States Hockey League. He spent two years with the Saints before moving to the Tacoma Rockets of the Western Hockey League (WHL), playing a few games with the Rockets when needed. In 1953 he joined the Seattle Bombers of the WHL, though left the team in 1954 when the Rangers hired him to coach there.

In 1954, he returned to the Rangers as a coach. He coached for one season and then served as the team's GM until 1964.

Personal life
Patrick's father, Lester, and brother, Lynn, were also coaches in the NHL. His son is Washington Capitals executive Dick Patrick.

Patrick married Jennie Farr in December 1942. During the Second World War both he and Lynn enlisted in the US Army in 1942; though not American citizens they were eligible based on their residency status in the United States. Patrick was initially stationed in Norfolk, Virginia, though also served on transports overseas in Africa, Italy, and France. He rose to the rank of captain before being discharged in September 1945.

Patrick died in Riverside, Connecticut, in 1998. He was survived by his wife, Jessie, four children, 12 grandchildren, and 2 great-grandchildren.

Career statistics

Regular season and playoffs

Coaching record

References

Bibliography

See also
 List of family relations in the NHL

External links
 

1915 births
1998 deaths
Canadian expatriate ice hockey players in the United States
Canadian ice hockey coaches
Canadian ice hockey defencemen
Ice hockey people from British Columbia
New York Rangers coaches
New York Rangers executives
New York Rangers general managers
New York Rangers players
New York Rovers players
People from Riverside, Connecticut
St. Paul Saints (USHL) players
Sportspeople from Victoria, British Columbia
Stanley Cup champions
Tacoma Rockets (WHL) players
United States Army officers
United States Army personnel of World War II